Mechetlinsky District (Mäsetle rayonı) is an administrative and municipal district (raion), one of the fifty-four in the Republic of Bashkortostan, Russia. It is located in the northeast of the republic and borders with Sverdlovsk Oblast in the north, Belokataysky District in the east, Kiginsky District in the southeast, and with Duvansky District in the south and west. Its administrative center is the rural locality (a selo) of Bolsheustyikinskoye. As of the 2010 Census, the total population of the district was 25,032, with the population of Bolsheustyikinskoye accounting for 31.3% of that number.

History
The district was established on August 20, 1930.

Administrative and municipal status
Within the framework of administrative divisions, Mechetlinsky District is one of the fifty-four in the Republic of Bashkortostan. The district is divided into twelve selsoviets, comprising forty-nine rural localities. As a municipal division, the district is incorporated as Mechetlinsky Municipal District. Its twelve selsoviets are incorporated as twelve rural settlements within the municipal district. The selo of Bolsheustyikinskoye serves as the administrative center of both the administrative and municipal district.

References

Notes

Sources

Districts of Bashkortostan
States and territories established in 1930